Geghmahovit or Bayburd is an abandoned town in the Ararat Province of Armenia. Traces of an early medieval armenian Bayburd settlement have been preserved in the Khosrov reserve, at the confluence of the Aghjo and Glan tributaries of the Azat River. Historical and bibliographic information about the village has not been preserved. The only mention is made by the 19th century historian, philologist-geographer  Ghevont Alishan, who thinks that the name of the village must have come from Baberd. In the central part of the village, a single-nave basilica church of the 5th century, built of polished gray basalt, is preserved. The carved capitals of the half-ruined church are remarkable: the archetype with an equal crucifix in the central part. Adjacent to the south is the vestibule, which is now in ruins.

According to the inscription preserved in the structure of the church, the village survived until the 17th century, when Armenians were deported in 1604 during the deportation carried out by Shah Abbas I of Persia Abbas the Great.

The cemetery from 7th-15th centuries is spread around the church, dozens of khachkars. In 1980s,  a stone with an inverted Greek inscription was found here during the cleaning works. Translation of the inscription is "Health" and "Happiness". Ruins, from after that period, shows that local Azerbaijanis population abandoned the village, presumably after the conflict between Azerbaijan and Armenia (Nagorno-Karabakh conflict).

References

External links 

Kiesling, Rediscovering Armenia, p. 52, available online at the US embassy to Armenia's website

Populated places in Ararat Province